James Dominic Brown (born 12 January 1998) is a professional footballer who plays as a defender for Scottish club St Johnstone. Born in England, he represents the Malta national team.

Club career

Millwall
Brown started his career in the youth team at Millwall and signed his first professional contract in April 2016. He made his professional debut in October 2016, in a 2–1 EFL Trophy victory over Gillingham.

In August 2017, Brown joined Carlisle United on loan. He made his debut for the club four days later on 29 August 2017, in an EFL Trophy match. He made his Football League debut for the club on 12 September in a match against Coventry City.

On 2 August 2018, Brown joined newly promoted Scottish Premiership side Livingston on a six-month loan deal.

St Johnstone
On 4 January 2021, Brown joined Scottish club St Johnstone on loan until the end of the season, following the recall of Millwall teammate Danny McNamara. Brown enjoyed success with the Saints in his brief loan spell, winning both the Scottish League Cup and the Scottish Cup with the side.

In July 2021, Brown signed a two-year deal with St Johnstone.

International career
Brown was born in England, and is of Maltese descent through a grandfather. He was first called up to the Malta national team in October 2021. He was again called up in May 2022 and made his debut on 1 June in a 1–0 defeat against Venezuela.

Personal life
Brown was born in Dover, Kent and attended Dover Grammar School for Boys in the town. He is of Maltese descent.

Career statistics

Honours
St Johnstone
Scottish Cup: 2020–21
Scottish League Cup: 2020–21

References

External links

1998 births
Living people
Footballers from Kent
Sportspeople from Dover, Kent
People with acquired Maltese citizenship
Maltese footballers
Malta international footballers
English footballers
English people of Maltese descent
Association football defenders
Millwall F.C. players
People educated at Dover Grammar School for Boys
Carlisle United F.C. players
English Football League players
Livingston F.C. players
Scottish Professional Football League players
St Johnstone F.C. players